Neaethus is a genus of tropiduchid planthoppers in the family Tropiduchidae. There are about 17 described species in Neaethus.

Species
These 17 species belong to the genus Neaethus:

 Neaethus bicornis Doering, 1941 i c g
 Neaethus consuetus Doering, 1941 i c g
 Neaethus curvaminis Doering, 1939 i c g
 Neaethus diversus Doering, 1939 i c g
 Neaethus fenestratus Melichar, 1906 i c g
 Neaethus fragosus Van Duzee, 1921 i c g b
 Neaethus grossus Melichar, 1906 i c g b
 Neaethus jacintiensus Doering, 1939 i c g b
 Neaethus maculatus Melichar, 1906 i c g b
 Neaethus nigronervosus Melichar, 1906 i c g
 Neaethus perlucidus Doering, 1939 i c g b
 Neaethus semivitreus Fowler, 1896 i c g
 Neaethus similis Doering, 1939 i c g b
 Neaethus sinehamatus Doering, 1939 i c g
 Neaethus unicus Doering, 1941 i c g
 Neaethus uniformus Doering, 1939 i c g
 Neaethus vitripennis (Stål, 1854) i c g b

Data sources: i = ITIS, c = Catalogue of Life, g = GBIF, b = Bugguide.net

References

Further reading

 

Auchenorrhyncha genera
Articles created by Qbugbot
Elicini